Costa Rica competed at the 2000 Summer Olympics in Sydney, Australia.

Medalists

Results by event

Athletics
Men's Marathon
 José Luis Molina
 Final – 2:20:37 (→ 39th place)

Cycling

Cross Country Mountain Bike
Men's Individual Competition
 José Adrián Bonilla
 Final – 2:30:02.72 (→ 33rd place)

Swimming
Men's 50m Freestyle
 Estebán Blanco
 Preliminary Heat – 23.72 (→ did not advance)

Men's 100m Breaststroke
 Juan José Madrigal
 Preliminary Heat – 01:05.14 (→ did not advance)

Men's 200m Breaststroke
 Juan José Madrigal
 Preliminary Heat – 02:24.49 (→ did not advance)

Women's 200m Freestyle
 Claudia Poll
 Preliminary Heat – 02:00.11
 Semi-final – 01:59.63
 Final – 01:58.81 (→  Bronze Medal)

Women's 400m Freestyle
 Claudia Poll
 Preliminary Heat – 04:09.33
 Final – 04:07.83 (→  Bronze Medal)

Women's 800m Freestyle
 Claudia Poll
 Preliminary Heat – DNS (→ did not advance)

Tennis
Men's singles
Juan Antonio Marín

Triathlon
Women's Individual Competition:
 Karina Fernández – DNF

See also
 Costa Rica at the 1999 Pan American Games

References

Wallechinsky, David (2004). The Complete Book of the Summer Olympics (Athens 2004 Edition). Toronto, Canada. . 
International Olympic Committee (2001). The Results. Retrieved 12 November 2005.
Sydney Organising Committee for the Olympic Games (2001). Official Report of the XXVII Olympiad Volume 1: Preparing for the Games. Retrieved 20 November 2005.
Sydney Organising Committee for the Olympic Games (2001). Official Report of the XXVII Olympiad Volume 2: Celebrating the Games. Retrieved 20 November 2005.
Sydney Organising Committee for the Olympic Games (2001). The Results. Retrieved 20 November 2005.
International Olympic Committee Web Site

Nations at the 2000 Summer Olympics
2000 Summer Olympics
Summer Olympics